Tatjana Stykel is a Russian mathematician who works as a professor of computational mathematics in the Institute of Mathematics of the University of Augsburg in Germany. Her research interests include numerical linear algebra, control theory, and differential-algebraic systems of equations.

Education and career
Stykel earned bachelor's and master's degrees from Novosibirsk State University in 1994 and 1996. After postgraduate study as a research institute at the Humboldt University of Berlin and Chemnitz University of Technology, she earned a doctorate (Dr. rer. nat.) from the Technical University of Berlin in 2002, and a habilitation from the Technical University of Berlin in 2008. Her doctoral dissertation, Analysis and Numerical Solution of Generalized Lyapunov Equation, was supervised by Volker Mehrmann.

After completing her doctorate, she was a postdoctoral researcher at the University of Calgary, and then a researcher and guest professor at the Technical University of Berlin from 2003 until 2011, when she took her current position in Augsburg.

Recognition
In 2003, Styke was one of the Second Prize winners of the Leslie Fox Prize for Numerical Analysis. She won the Richard von Mises Prize of the Gesellschaft für Angewandte Mathematik und Mechanik in 2007.

References

External links
Home page

Year of birth missing (living people)
Living people
Russian mathematicians
20th-century German mathematicians
Women mathematicians
Novosibirsk State University alumni
Technical University of Berlin alumni
Academic staff of the University of Augsburg
21st-century German mathematicians